Arne Jansen (born 26 November 1975) is a German jazz guitarist.

Biography  
As a teenager Jansen picked up the guitar, inspired by Jimi Hendrix and the Dire Straits. The great storytellers of pop, such as Bob Dylan and Joni Mitchell also belonged to his early sources of inspiration just like the Beatles and Pink Floyd, who he discovered in his parents' record collection. At the age of 17 he discovered the music of Pat Metheny and John Scofield, which opened up new horizons for him. He has also studied guitar with Pat Metheny, Mick Goodrick, John Abercrombie, Kurt Rosenwinkel, and Philip Catherine. From 1998-2000 Mhe was a member of the National Youth Jazz Orchestra of Germany, conducted by Peter Herbolzheimer, and was on concert tours with numerous ensembles through the US, Japan, Argentina, Scandinavia, Turkey, Russia, the Ukraine and south-east Europe. Fellow artists and ensembles include the band Naked Raven, musicians Paul Van Dyk, Jocelyn B. Smith and Tim Fischer, in addition to the DanGer (Danish-German Jazzsextett), Fitzwilliam String Quartet, and the Film Orchestra Babelsberg.

Collaborative work as guitarist with Michael Thalheimer & Bert Wrede for the production of Shakespeare's "As You Like It" at the German Theatre Berlin, 2008. With the Arne Jansen Trio he gave concerts at the Jazzfest Berlin 2008, Enjoy Jazz 2008, Jazz Baltica 2009, Jazzahead-German Jazz Meeting 2010, Jazz Utsav-Festival Delhi, India 2014, X-Jazz Festival Berlin 2015, Jazz Baltica 2015, Africa-Tour 2017 (Angola, Mozambique, Senegal), Collaboration with "Orchestra Baobab" (Senegal). Continuous work with his trio, Katja Riemann, Jazzanova, Nils Wülker Group, and Matthias Schweighöfer.

Honors 
 2007: Prize-winner at the Berlin Senate's Studio-Competition with the Arne Jansen Trio
 2014: Winner of Echo Jazz award for the album The Sleep of Reason – Ode to Goya, with the Arne Jansen Trio
 2017: Winner of Echo Jazz award for the album Nine Firmaments, with the Arne Jansen Trio

Discography

Solo albums 
 2006: My Tree (Traumton Records), with Arne Jansen Trio
 2008: Younger Than That Now (Traumton Records), with Arne Jansen Trio
 2013: The Sleep of Reason – Ode to Goya (ACT ) (awarded Echo Jazz)
 2016: Nine Firmaments (Traumton Records), with Arne Jansen Trio (awarded Echo Jazz)

Collaborations 

 With Firomanum (Arne Jansen, Eva Kruse, Niels Klein, Nils Tegen)
 2002: New Old Tendency (SATRip)
 2006: Frames (Traumton Records)

 With BuJazzO
 1987: On Tour (Mons Records), with Bundesjugendjazzorchester
 1999: Das Jugendjazzorchester Der Bundesrepublik Deutschland (Gerling), with Peter Herbolzheimer

 The New Cool Trio (David Helbock, Sebastian Studnitzky, Arne Jansen)
 2021: The New Cool (ACT)

References

External links 
 
 Arne Jansen Trio - Live at A-Trane - Jazzfest Berlin on YouTube
 Arne Jansen Trio - Nine Firmaments (EPK - New Album, October 2016) on YouTube

1975 births
Living people
Musicians from Kiel
German jazz composers
Male jazz composers
German jazz guitarists
German male guitarists
21st-century guitarists
21st-century German male musicians